The 2016 Canadian Rugby Championship was the 8th season of the Canadian Rugby Championship. The competition took place between June 4 and July 24, 2016. The format for the 2016 season saw a round-robin system where each team play their regional opponent home-and-away and the two teams from the opposite region once, for a total of four games each.

The Ontario Blues won their fifth Championship, reclaiming the MacTier Cup from the Prairie Wolf Pack.

Teams

Standings

Fixtures
 All times local to where the game is being played

Week 1

Week 2

Week 3

Week 4

Week 5

See also 
Canadian Rugby Championship
Rugby Canada

References 

Canadian Rugby Championship
Canadian Rugby Championship seasons
CRC